Serena Williams was the defending champion, but did not participate this year due to pregnancy.

Elina Svitolina won the title, defeating Simona Halep in the final, 4–6, 7–5, 6–1.

Seeds
The top eight seeds received a bye into the second round.

Draw

Finals

Top half

Section 1

Section 2

Bottom half

Section 3

Section 4

Qualifying

Seeds

Qualifiers

Draw

First qualifier

Second qualifier

Third qualifier

Fourth qualifier

Fifth qualifier

Sixth qualifier

Seventh qualifier

Eighth qualifier

References
Main draw
Qualifying draw

Women's Singles